"Hurt" is a song by American hip hop recording artist T.I., released as the third official single from his fifth studio album T.I. vs. T.I.P. (2007). The hardcore hip hop song, produced by Timbaland and Danja, features guest appearances from fellow American rappers Busta Rhymes and Alfamega.

Music video
The song's music video premiered on BET's 106 & Park on October 3, 2007. The video for "Hurt" includes cameo appearances from Grand Hustle's Young Dro, Big Kuntry King, DJ Drama, Xtaci, Maino and Yelawolf.

In other media
The official remix features a new verse from fellow Atlanta-based rapper Young Jeezy.

Canadian pop punk group Simple Plan used the same instrumental in their song, "Generation", which was also produced by Danja. It was included on their self-titled studio album Simple Plan, released in 2008. Some words from Simple Plan : "When we were in Miami the first time and Danja played us that beat, we wanted to use it, but he didn't know if T.I. was using it on his album. After the third time we went back, he hadn't heard back from T.I. so we started writing some stuff on it. But later he called and said he was using it. By then we liked what we had written, and T.I. didn't care." "I love what he did with it," says Comeau of T.I.'s "Hurt." "Maybe one day we'll do a mash-up."

The Montreal Canadiens use the beat to "Hurt" whenever they score a goal.

UK rapper Kano has made a freestyle over this songs instrumentals on his MC No.1 mixtape.

Track listing

A-side
1. "Hurt [Explicit]"
2. "Hurt [Instrumental]"

B-side
1. "Hurt [Radio]"

Charts

References

2007 singles
2007 songs
Busta Rhymes songs
T.I. songs
Grand Hustle Records singles
Atlantic Records singles
Hardcore hip hop songs
Song recordings produced by Danja (record producer)
Songs written by Danja (record producer)
Songs written by T.I.
Songs written by Busta Rhymes